The Drunken Sailor and other Kids Favorites is an album by Tim Hart and Friends.

This album follows Tim Hart's first collection "My Very Favorite Nursery Rhymes". There is a greater variety in treatment - "Hush Little Baby" is sung as a calypso, with the tune of "Island in the Sun" on oil-drums creeping in at the end. Melanie Harrold's "A Fox Jumped Up" has a bouncy hodown fiddle, though there is no credit given for any fiddler. Brian Golbey does a comic-lugubrious version of "Clementine" with steel guitar accompaniment. (Brian had also been present on the first "Silly Sisters" album.) "What shall We Do With Drunken Sailor" is out-an-out disco a la Boney M. "Who Killed Cock Robin" has Maddy Prior double tracking in a very high pitched voice. Notable uilleann pipes player Davy Spillane plays, apprioriately, on the Irish song "Cockles and Mussels". Maddy does a duet with Melanie Harrold on "Michael Finnegal", to the sound of mandolas and mandolins (or perhaps they are synthesisers).

EMI released an hour-long cassette called "Favorite Nursery Rhymes" in 1985. It contained all these tracks except "Widdecombe Fair" and "Curly Locks". It also contained all but two tracks from "My Very Favorite Nursery Rhymes". In their place there was a new track - "Humpty Dumpty". In 1989 EMI/Music For Pleasure released a 3-CD set called "The Children's Collection". One CD consisted of a different selection of these tracks. The same two tracks were missing from "The Drunken Sailor", but all the tracks from "My Very Favorite Nursery Rhymes" were present. Running time about 35 minutes. These tracks have not been publicly available since 1989. Producer Tim Hart. Engineer Dave Bascombe, Jerry Boys. Recorded 1983

Track listing 

LP - side one
 Over The Hills And Far Away (Trad) 
 A Fox Jumped Up (Trad) 
 Clementine (Trad) 
 Three Jolly Rogues Of Lynn (Trad) 
 Who Killed Cock Robin? (Trad) 
 Cockles and Mussels (Trad) 
 Hush Little Baby (Trad)

LP - side two
 What Shall We Do With The Drunken Sailor? (Trad) 
 The Riddle Song (Child Ballad 1) (Trad) 
 Michael Finnigan (Trad) 
 Widecombe Fair (Trad) 
 Froggy's Courting (Trad) 
 Curly Locks (Trad)

Good News 

Park Records  have re-released Tim Hart's Very Favorite Nursery Rhyme Record; a 2-CD album containing 32 tracks. I believe this was done to help pay for his cancer treatment, hopefully the money will now be used towards some sort of memorial for Tim.

Track listing 

CD1

 Oh The Grand Old Duke Of York
 Sing A Song Of Sixpence
 Once I Caught A Fish Alive
 Medley
 Little Bo Peep
 Mary, Mary Quite Contrary
 Old MacDonald Had A Farm
 There Was An Old Woman Tossed Up In A Basket
 Twinkle, Twinkle Little Star
 Boys And Girls Come Out To Play
 Nick Nack Paddy Wack
 Baa, Baa Black Sheep
 Bobby Shaftoe
 Hush-A-Bye-Baby
 Humpty Dumpty
 Lavenders Blue (Dilly Dilly)
 London Bridge Is Falling Down
 Oranges And Lemons
 Oh Dear What Can The Matter Be

CD2

 Over The Hills And Far Away
 A Fox Jumped Up
 Clementine
 Three Jolly Rogues Of Lynn
 Who Killed Cock Robin?
 Cockles And Mussels
 Hush Little Baby
 What Shall We Do With The Drunken Sailor?
 The Riddle Song
 Michael Finnigan
 Widdicombe Fair
 Froggy’s Courting
 Curly Locks

Personnel 

 Maddy Prior - vocals
 Melanie Harrold - vocals
 Brian Golbey - vocals
 Gina Fullerlove - French horn
 B.J. Cole - steel guitar
 Rick Kemp - bass
 Spike Fullerlove - vocals
 Tamsey Kaner - cello
 Lea Nicholson - concertina
 Steve Noble - percussion
 Debbie Paul - vocals
 Andy Richards - synthesiser
 Beverly Jane Smith - vocals
 Davy Spillane - uilleann pipes
 The Livingston Hooray Ensemble - chorus

Tim Hart albums
1983 albums